York Beach is a village within the town of York, Maine, United States. The York Beach area consists of Long Sands and Short Sands beaches on the Atlantic Ocean in the Gulf of Maine. The two beaches are separated by Cape Neddick. Cape Neddick and York Beach together comprise the Cape Neddick census-designated place, with a year-round population of 2,568. The town of York consists of the communities of York Beach, Cape Neddick, York Harbor, and the village of York; 12,529 residents with a summer months population increase to an estimated 52,000 people.

Beaches
There are two main beaches which make up the York Beach area.

Long Sands Beach – This is one of two beaches making up the York Beach town.

Short Sands Beach – This other beach is located on the north side of Cape Neddick, home of Cape Neddick Light, locally known as "Nubble Light". This is a much shorter beach, with a more densely developed downtown area that has many historic buildings and stores. The area has many arcades, shops, restaurants, and nightlife. Attractions include the Goldenrod, the Fun-O-Rama, and York's Wild Kingdom.

Special events
York Days - An annual event which takes place around the downtown York Beach area. York Days takes place on a weekend in early August every year. Events include a craft fair, a soft-ball tournament, and a large fireworks display on the last Sunday of the weekend.

Lighting of the Nubble - Nubble Light is lit up twice a year with Christmas lights. The first time is known as "Christmas in July", and takes place around July 25 every year. The second is the "Annual Lighting of the Nubble", and takes place in December to honor the actual holiday season.

Locations of interest

Cape Neddick Light, also known as Nubble Lighthouse. Construction began in 1876 and cost $15,000. It was first illuminated on July 1, 1879. The lighthouse was originally red but has been painted white since 1902. The distinctive red house was also built in 1902. The lighthouse became automated in 1987.

Goldenrod – Established by Edward and Mattie Talpey in 1896 on the very location it stands today.

York’s Wild Kingdom – This family-oriented zoo and amusement park is located in downtown York Beach.

Union Bluff Hotel - This hotel has stood on the Union Bluffs since being built in 1875 by a pioneer named Moses French. The area around the hotel greatly expanded due to tourism in the late 1870s; and the location of the Union Bluff hotel was perfect for tourists to stay. The original Union Bluff Hotel was one of the oldest wooden buildings in York Beach until the original building was destroyed by fire in 1987. It was rebuilt in just two years, in 1989; and has been the same ever since. The hotel underwent multiple name changes, they included: The Wahnita (c. 1900s), The York Plaza Hotel (c. 1930s), and The Union Bluff Hotel (c. 1976).

Government
York Beach is a portion of the town of York, which has a council-manager form of government.

References

External links
 Town of York, Maine
 York Public Library
 Old York Historical Society
 Cape Neddick Lighthouse (Nubble Light)

Villages in York County, Maine
York, Maine
Beaches of Maine
Landforms of York County, Maine
Populated coastal places in Maine
Resort towns